Chris Haw (born 1981) is a Catholic theologian and professor in the United States who was an important figure in New Monasticism.

Biography 
Haw was baptized into the Catholic Church and attended Catholic churches as a child until his mother started attending Willow Creek Community Church, after which he began attending there as well.

In 2004, Haw founded Camden Community House, a Christian intentional community in Camden, New Jersey, composed of people who seek to emulate early Christians by being actively involved in their community and by sharing their wealth among the community.

He then studied theology at Villanova University and spent a semester in Belize studying Christian views on environmentalism.

In 2008, he co-wrote Jesus for President: Politics for Ordinary Radicals with Shane Claiborne, whom he met at Willow Creek.

He graduated from Villanova in 2009 with an MA in Theology, and later studied for a PhD at Notre Dame.

Haw eventually returned to Catholicism.

Book on reversion to Catholicism 

From Willow Creek to Sacred Heart: Rekindling My Love for Catholicism is a book of Christian apologetics by Haw that documents his transitions from Catholicism to evangelicalism and back again. The book was published by Ave Maria Press in 2012. The first half of the book is autobiographical while the second half is a defense against evangelical criticisms of Catholicism.

William T. Cavanaugh, who teaches Catholic studies at DePaul University, wrote the afterword for the book. In a National Catholic Reporter review, Tom Roberts compares From Willow Creek to Sacred Heart to Kaya Oakes' Radical Reinvention: An Unlikely Return to the Catholic Church, calling them both "very smart books". Fox News Channel interviewed Haw about From Willow Creek to Sacred Heart. In his book Reborn on the Fourth of July: The Challenge of Faith, Patriotism & Conscience, Logan Mehl-Laituri writes about From Willow Creek to Sacred Heart, saying that he "cannot recommend it highly enough". A Publishers Weekly reviewer suggests that the book will interest Protestants and Catholics alike because the book provides opportunity for both groups to learn and reflect on their spiritual lives. LaVonne Neff, in The Christian Century, says that "Haw does an exceptionally fine job of uniting theology, personal narrative and contemporary social realities".

Teaching 
In 2018, Haw was hired as a theology professor at the University of Scranton.

Personal life 
Haw is married to Cassie and they have a son and a daughter.

Citations

References

Official website 
http://www.chris-haw.com/

1981 births
21st-century American Roman Catholic theologians
21st-century Protestant theologians
American autobiographers
American Christian pacifists
American economics writers
American evangelicals
American male non-fiction writers
American non-fiction environmental writers
Christian monasticism
Liberation theologians
Living people
People from the Chicago metropolitan area
Writers about activism and social change
Writers from Camden, New Jersey
Writers from Illinois
21st-century American non-fiction writers
Catholics from New Jersey
21st-century American male writers